Alexei Valerevich Makarov (15 February 1972) is a Russian actor of theatre and cinema. Born 1972 in Omsk in family of actors Valeriy Makarov and Lyubov Polishchuk.

Biography
After high school, at the second attempt, he entered the Russian University of Theatre Arts - GITIS (rate of P. Chomsky)

In 1994, after graduation, I worked in the theater Mossovet, but as the great roles he was not offered in 29 years has left the theater. By that time he already had experience in film Check, The Rifleman of the Voroshilov Regiment. But the actor's finest hour came after the release of the film Countdown, in which he starred.

Filmography
 The Rifleman of the Voroshilov Regiment (1998)
 In Motion (2002)
 Moscow Saga (2004)
 Countdown (2004)
 The Three Musketeers (2013)
 About Love (2015)
 Story of One Appointment (2018)

External links and references
 Черновик Андрея
 Сайт Алексея Макарова
  Алексей Макаров не хочет прослыть суперменом
 Сайт, посвящённый актёру Алексею Макарову

1972 births
Living people
Actors from Omsk
Russian male film actors
Russian male television actors
Russian male stage actors
Russian Academy of Theatre Arts alumni